The 2011 Women's Indoor Hockey World Cup was the third edition of this tournament. It was played at 8–13 February 2011 in Poznań, Poland. For the first time in history, teams from all five continents were represented.

Netherlands was the defending champion.

Participating teams

Venue
All matches were played at the Poznań International Fair Exhibition Hall.

Pools

Results

Preliminary round

Pool A

Pool B

Classification round

Fifth to twelfth place classification

Eleventh and twelfth place

Ninth and tenth place

Seventh and eighth place

Fifth and sixth place

First to fourth place classification

Semi-finals

Bronze-medal match

Gold-medal match

Statistics

Awards

Final ranking

See also
 2011 Men's Indoor Hockey World Cup

References

External links

2011
Indoor Hockey World Cup
Indoor Hockey World Cup
International women's field hockey competitions hosted by Poland
Sport in Poznań
21st century in Poznań
Indoor Hockey World Cup Women
World Cup